Sciocoris sideritidis is a species of shield bug belonging to the family Pentatomidae, subfamily Pentatominae.

The head is quite characteristic and stretched with the ante-ocular part closer than in other species. Its eyes are prominent from the edge of the head. Scutellum is about as wide as long.

It is mainly found in France and Italy.

References

 Rider D.A., 2004 - Family Pentatomidae - Catalogue of the Heteroptera of the Palaearctic Region

External links
 BioLib
 Fauna Europaea

Sciocorini
Insects described in 1858
Hemiptera of Europe